The Greater Cincinnati Collegiate Connection (previously, Greater Cincinnati Consortium of Colleges and Universities), stylized as GC3, is an organization consisting of all of the accredited colleges and universities in the Greater Cincinnati area. The GC3 gives students access to course offerings of the other institutions through a cross-registration arrangement as well as access to library resources of the other schools in the consortium.

Members

External links 
 

 
College and university associations and consortia in the United States
Education in Cincinnati